David D. Jackson (born November 7, 1946) is an American former politician who served as a Republican in the Kansas State Senate from 2001 to 2004.

Jackson is the owner of a greenhouse in Topeka. He was originally elected to the Senate in 2000. In the 2004 election, he faced a challenge from Democrat (and future Governor) Laura Kelly for his Senate seat in the 18th district; Jackson was narrowly defeated in the general election, taking 49.8% of the vote and losing by fewer than 100 votes in the final count.

In 2016, Jackson attempted to win back the seat, challenging Kelly once again. He lost another close election, this time claiming 48.3% of the vote.

References

Republican Party Kansas state senators
21st-century American politicians
People from Topeka, Kansas
1946 births
Living people